Pound for the Sound is Capdown's second full-length studio album. Released in September 2001, it is the follow-up to the previous year's Civil Disobedients. The songs are a mix of hardcore and the ska-core sound. The lyrics in the album show a positive attitude towards life and lyrical themes include overcoming tough situations and racism (the song "Judgement Days"). "Dub #2" is the only instrumental and almost all the tracks have sax playing from singer Jake. It was released on London-based indie label Household Name Records and hit 48 in the UK charts (the highest charting release on the label). Pound for the Sound received critical acclaim from publications such as Kerrang! who described it as "damn near perfect" and awarded it 4 K's out of 5.

Track listing
"Faith No More"
"What Doesn't Kill You..."
"Strength In Numbers"
"Judgement Days"
"An A-Political Stand of Reasons"
"Time to Get Out"
"Pound for the Sound"
"Dub #2"
"Progression vs Punk Rock"
"Dealer Fever"
"6-8-1"

Capdown albums
2001 albums
Household Name Records albums